Kratt (or kratid in plural; also pisuhänd, puuk, tulihänd, vedaja), is a magical creature in old Estonian mythology, a treasure-bearer.

A kratt was a creature formed from hay or of old household implements by its master, who then had to give the Devil three drops of blood to bring life to the kratt.

The kratt was notable for doing everything the master ordered it to and was mostly used for stealing and bringing various goods for the kratt's owner. It was said to be able to fly around. An interesting aspect of the kratt is that it was necessary for it to constantly keep working, otherwise it would turn dangerous to its owner. Once the kratt became unnecessary, the master of the kratt would ask the creature to do impossible things such as build a ladder from bread, as portrayed in Andrus Kivirähk's Rehepapp (The Old Barny). Impossible tasks took so long to complete that it caused the kratt, which was made of hay, to catch fire and burn to pieces, thus solving the issue of how to get rid of the problematic creature.

In folk astronomy a bolide was thought to be a kratt that had been given an impossible job. The enraged kratt was thought to catch on fire and burn away as a fireball.

In popular culture
The kratt has notably appeared in the works of Andrus Kivirähk, the Estonian author, whose work often draws upon Estonian mythology and presents it in a humorous and fairy-tale-like way. His book Rehepapp ehk November (Old Barny aka November) offers a description that suggests Estonians might have used blackcurrant berries instead of blood to cheat the Devil and save their souls from going to hell.

Estonian composer and conductor Eduard Tubin (1905–1982) wrote a ballet titled Kratt, which is entirely based on folk tunes. It is the first Estonian ballet and it deals with topics like: Will money bring happiness, How can damnation be born from greed, and Will there be a place for love in a world that puts such a great value on material goods.

The 2017 film November features kratt and other elements of Estonian folklore.

Modern usage 
The similarity of kratts to artificial intelligences has resulted that in Estonia this character is used as a metaphor for AI and its complexities. For instance, algorithmic-liability law is also called the Kratt law.

References

Estonian legendary creatures